Thick Syrup Records is an independent record label from Little Rock, Arkansas. Founded by Travis McElroy in 2006, it specializes in indie rock and underground music. It has released the work of known acts such as Matt Cameron, Jad Fair from Half Japanese, Bob Bert of Sonic Youth, Penn Jillette, Don Fleming and Velvet Monkeys. The label also releases compilation albums with multiple artists.

History
Thick Syrup Records (TSR) was founded by Travis McElroy in 2005, but the first year was spent on finances and promoting the imprint. The label's first release was 2005’s Gotta Get It Outta Here by Nathan Brown under the moniker Browningham. McElroy's friend Brian Lovell helped with the label early on, and the name was chosen in honor of Lovell swallowing ipecac on a dare from McElroy. Kevin Rogers later began working with the label in Lovell's place.

As of 2013, Thick Syrup has released about 60 albums that include genres as diverse as art punk, low-fi indie rock, experimental exercises, and rock. According to Arkansas Online, "Thick Syrup has helped blaze a proudly twisted musical path all from the humble confines of central Arkansas."

Artists
The following is a partial list of artists, past and present, associated with the label:

The Alpha Ray
Androids of Ex-Lovers
Avondale Airforce
Bald Mountain
Ben Lee
Bewitched (Bob Bert)
Blag Dahlia (Dwarves)
Bloodless Cooties
BMX Bandits
Bob Fay (Sebadoh) 
Boister
The Book of Amy
Brothers of the Sonic Cloth (TAD)
Browningham
Bryan Frazier
Chicken Snake
Chrome Cranks
CooCooRockinTime
Damien Jurado
David Fair
David Greenberger (The Duplex Planet)
David Markey (film director)
Don Fleming
The Empty Boat People
Everett True (The Legend!)
Ezra Lbs
Frown Pow'r
Ginsu Wives
Half Japanese
Herding Kittens
INT'L Shades
Jad Fair
Jam Messengers
Julie Cafritz (Pussy Galore)
Ken Stringfellow (Posies, Big Star, R.E.M.)
Life Size Pizza
Liquid Skulls
Lucero
Lurch and Holler
Matt Cameron
Mike Watt (The Stooges, Minutemen)
Nine Lives Pussy
Penn Jillette
R. Stevie Moore
The Reparations
Rob Kennedy (Workdogs, Jam Messengers)
The SEE
Sit: Boy Girl Boy Girl
Smoke Up Johnny
Stella Fancy
Stephen Egerton (The Descendents)
Steve Turner (Mudhoney)
Sweet Eagle
The Tinklers
To Live and Shave in L.A.
Twelve Tone Elevator
Velvet Monkeys
Venture Lift
Weird Paul Petroskey
The Whistling Joy Jumpers (Jad Fair, Thollem McDonas, & Brian Chase of Yeah Yeah Yeahs)
Yuri Landman Ensemble

Discography
This incomplete list is organized by catalog number, a roughly chronological number system established by the label and assigned to each release.

See also: List of available releases on Blue Collar Distro

References

External links
Official Website
Thick Syrup Records on MySpace (Official)
Thick Syrup Records on Facebook (Official)

American independent record labels
Indie rock record labels
Companies based in Arkansas
Alternative rock record labels
Record labels established in 2006